Scattergood Friends School in Cedar County, Iowa, is a rural, private high school educating students in grades nine through twelve and, since 2020, middle school educating students in grades six through eight.  Founded in 1890 by Iowa Wilburite Quakers to provide a "guarded education" for their children, it is owned and operated by Iowa Yearly Meeting of Friends (Conservative).

The school closed for a period during the Great Depression. Alarmed at the increasing anti-Semitism and political suppression by the Nazi Party of Germany at the time of Kristallnacht, Quakers of Iowa proposed in 1939 to receive refugees from Germany and house them at the Scattergood School. From 1939 through 1943, they operated what they called the 'Scattergood Hostel,' accepting a total of 185 refugees and helping them to resettle in the United States. After 1943 refugees were unable to leave Germany.

After the end of the war, the school was reopened for educational operations. Since the late 20th century, about one third of students and staff have been Quakers, with the rest coming from different faith backgrounds.

Background
Scattergood School, founded in 1890, is located in Cedar County, Iowa, two miles (3 km) east and one half mile south of the town of West Branch. It offers a college preparatory curriculum for grades nine through twelve. Owned and operated by Iowa Yearly Meeting of Friends (Conservative), the school is accredited by the Iowa Department of Education and by the Independent Schools Association of the Central States (ISACS). In addition to academic achievement, the Scattergood program emphasizes community life, responsible world citizenship, and communal work.

Although there are several day students each year, nearly all students reside in dormitories (housing 42 students) on campus. Likewise, most of the 25 faculty and staff live in on-campus apartments. The school is based on small class sizes and a family atmosphere.

Teaching and learning at Scattergood take place in many settings beyond the classroom.

Everyone at Scattergood participates in a communal work program, called the crew system. This includes everything from working on the farm to making daily breakfast for members of the school. Similarly, all cleaning on campus is done by jointly by students and staff. Work assignments rotate monthly.

Roughly a quarter of Scattergood students come from outside the United States. Former Bolivian president Gonzalo Sánchez de Lozada, is a Scattergood graduate.

Courses
In addition to regular offerings in math and science, the school has some Humanities courses: 
History of the English Language
Logic
Utopian Societies
Messianic Archetypes in Film and Literature
Art of Tibetan Religion and Culture
Quakerism
Taoism
Creative Writing

Foreign languages include Spanish, Arabic, and French.

Sports offered in physical education include soccer, Fencing, Archery, Roller Hockey, Bicycle Training, Ultimate Frisbee, Yoga, Archery, Basketball, and Aikido.

The term "Projects" is used to cover a variety of skills, arts and crafts: Ceramics, Glassblowing, Bow Making, Juggling, Stained Glass, Elizabethan Rapier, Electronic music, Food preservation, Drama, Painting, Poultry Project and Farm Project.

May Term Trips
During May Term, all juniors and seniors have the option to leave campus for a month-long trip. The trips usually involve community service or physical challenge. The option to take a student-planned "independent trip" is also available. Past May Term trips have included:
Bike trip along the Mississippi River (from Natchez, Mississippi to Scattergood)
Hiking 250 miles of the Appalachian Trail
Latin America 
East Coast
Gulf Coast

May Term Classes
During May Term, when juniors and seniors leave campus, underclassmen have the opportunity to experience Project Based Learning curriculum.  Examples of these classes have included:
The Physics of Flight
Apiculture and Agriculture 
Animal Behavior During Mating and Parenting
Animal Psychology
Restaurant Management
The Art of Taking Tea
Boat Building
Monarch Conservation

Scattergood Hostel
Because of the financial difficulties faced by families during the Great Depression, the school suspended its operations in 1931. Alarmed at the increasing persecution of Jews and political dissidents in Nazi Germany, Quakers in Iowa proposed to use the school as a center to house refugees and help them resettle in the United States.

Before the United States entered World War II, Quakers (mostly farmers) collaborated to create a place for the European refugees, supporting them through a web of volunteers. Both refugees and volunteers worked communally together to operate the facility, including its farm. A total of 185 refugees were housed here from 1939 to 1943. After that it became nearly impossible for them to escape from Europe.

"In addition to therapeutic social activities, the Scattergood staff provided health care, language classes, and job training, hoping to give refugees, or guests as they were called, a foundation on which to rebuild their lives." Stays at the hostel averaged four months, a time of respite.

Legacy
 The Scattergood Hostel was explored in an exhibit at Traces Museum, which operated in St. Paul, Minnesota from 2005 through 2008, as well as a traveling exhibit viewed by tens of thousands throughout the Midwest. When the museum closed, the United States Holocaust Museum of Washington, DC agreed to take the permanent exhibit materials.
 In 2007, Iowa Public TV produced an episode on the Scattergood Hostel for its Living in Iowa series, titled "Out of Hitler's Reach" and based on the book of the same name by Michael Luick-Thrams, founder and director of the Traces Museum.

Recommended reading
Berquist, Robert, et al., Scattergood Friends School, 1890-1990
Luick-Thrams, Michael.  Out of Hitler's Reach: The Scattergood Hostel For European Refugees, 1939-1943, Iowa State Press, 1997

See also
List of high schools in Iowa

References

External links
 
Independent Schools Association of the Central States (ISACS)
"Out of Hitler's Reach", episode of Living in Iowa, Iowa Public TV, 2007 - about the Scattergood Hostel during World War II

Quaker schools in Iowa
Private high schools in Iowa
Schools in Cedar County, Iowa
Preparatory schools in Iowa
1880 establishments in Iowa